Arrest is the action of the police or another authority to apprehend and take under guard a person who is suspected of committing a crime.

Arrest and its derivations may also refer to:

Law
 Ship arrest, a procedure under maritime law

Places
 Arrest, Somme, a commune of the Somme département in France
 Arresting, Germany, a village

Arts, entertainment, and media
 "Arrested" (Modern Family), an episode of the television series Modern Family
 "The Arrest", a song by Andrew Lloyd Webber and Tim Rice from the 1971 rock opera Jesus Christ Superstar

Other uses
 Arrest, a feature of the development of some nematodes (particularly of the Trichostrongyloidea superfamily of the Strongylida order), in which the larva enters tissue of the host and waits for favourable conditions before continuing to develop to adulthood, similar to the dauer larva stage
 "Arrested landing" or arrestment, the use by an aircraft of a tailhook to bring it to a stop upon landing (either on a ship or land) 
 Arresting gear, used to slow an aircraft as it lands
 Cardiac arrest, the cessation of normal circulation of the blood due to failure of the ventricles of the heart to contract effectively

See also
Arrested development (disambiguation)